This article lists noted individuals associated with the University of California, Irvine.

Students and alumni

The following are noted alumni and students of the University of California, Irvine, listed by the field(s) they have been noted for. When the information is known and available, degree and year are listed in parentheses.

Art
 Michael Asher (B.F.A. 1966) – conceptual artist
 Dan Bayles (M.F.A. 2007) – abstract artist
 Chris Burden (M.F.A. 1971) – performance artist
 Erica Cho (M.F.A) – artist
 Garnet Hertz (M.F.A, PhD.) – artist, designer, academic
 Tom Jancar, (B.A. 1974 and M.F.A. 1976) - contemporary art dealer Jancar Kuhlenschmidt Gallery and Jancar Gallery
 Barbara T. Smith (M.F.A. 1971) – performance artist
 James Turrell - attended, minimalist artist primarily known for his use of light and space installations

Film, television, and entertainment

 Colet Abedi (B.A. English literature) – writer and television producer
 Aras Baskauskas (B.A. 2002, philosophy, MBA 2004) – winner on TV reality show Survivor; CEO of TundraWear.com
 Jim Berney (B.S. 1989, computer science) – Academy award-nominated technical director, The Lord of the Rings, The Matrix
 Nazanin Boniadi (B.S. 2003, biological sciences) – actress, official spokeswoman for Amnesty International
 Crista Flanagan (M.F.A. 2001) – actress, Mad Men
 Steve Franks (B.A. 1991) – writer and television producer
 Leslie Fu (B.S. 2014, biological sciences) - YouTube streamer
 Bob Gunton (B.A. 1968) – actor, The Shawshank Redemption, 24, Desperate Housewives; Tony-nominated for Broadway roles in Evita and Sweeney Todd
 Tyler Hoechlin (student athlete – baseball) – actor, star of Teen Wolf and Superman & Lois
Xanthe Huynh (attended)- voice actress, known for her work on The Familiar of Zero, Magical Girl Lyrical, K-On!, Love Live, Persona, and Fire Emblem
Carrie Ann Inaba (attended) – actress/dancer, a judge on ABC's Dancing with the Stars
Chris Kelly (B.A. 2005) – comedy writer (Saturday Night Live) and filmmaker (Other People); co-creator of The Other Two
 Kelly Lin (attended, Economics and English & Comparative Literature) – Taiwanese actress, nominated for best actress for role in Mad Detective at 2007 Venice Film Festival
 Jon Lovitz (B.A. 1979, Theater) – actor and comedian, Saturday Night Live
 Andrea Lowell (attended, Biology) – model, Playboy, VH1's The Surreal Life #6
 Beth Malone (B.A. 2000, Theater) - Tony award nominee for Best Actress in a musical
 Tom Martin (B.A. 1987, Economics & Political Science) – TV writer whose credits include The Simpsons and Saturday Night Live
 Joseph McGinty Nichol a.k.a. McG (B.S. 1990, Psychology) – film director (Charlie's Angels, Terminator Salvation), co-creator of TV series The O.C.
 Joseph Andrew Mclean (English Literature, Politics, Screenwriting) – Scottish filmmaker, studied at UCI as an exchange student from the University of Glasgow
 Jeff Meek (B.A. 1983, Drama) – TV actor, Raven, As the World Turns and Mortal Kombat: Conquest
 Windell Middlebrooks (M.F.A. 2004, Drama) – actor, star of Body of Proof
 Crystal Kung-Minkoff (B.A., Biology) — American television personality.
 Grant Nieporte (B.A. 1995, Social Sciences) – film writer, credits include 2008 Will Smith film Seven Pounds
 Sophie Oda (B.F.A. 2012, Musical Theater) – guest actress on The Suite Life of Zack & Cody
 Kelly Perine (M.F.A. Acting, 1994), television actor (Between Brothers, The Parent 'Hood, One on One)
 Aurora Snow (attended, Theater Arts, Business) – pornographic actress
 Phil Tippett (B.A., Fine Arts) – filmmaker, Star Wars, RoboCop and Jurassic Park
 Brian Thompson (M.F.A. Acting, 1984) – actor
 Thuy Trang (attended, Civil Engineering) – actress, Trini from Power Rangers
 Byron Velvick (B.A. 1987, English) – star of The Bachelor, Season 6

Literature
 Nevada Barr (M.F.A. 1978) – author of Anna Pigeon Mysteries
 Michael A. Bellesiles (PhD 1986) – controversial historian and author of Arming America, The Origins of a National Gun Culture
 Aimee Bender (M.F.A. 1998) – author of The Girl in the Flammable Skirt
 David Benioff (M.F.A. 1999) – author of The 25th Hour, husband of actress Amanda Peet, co-creator of HBO's hit television series Game of Thrones
 Chelsea Cain (B.A. 1994, Political Science) – fiction writer
 Michael Chabon (M.F.A. 1987) – 2001 Pulitzer Prize-winning author for his novel The Amazing Adventures of Kavalier & Clay
 Leonard Chang (M.F.A) – Korean-American writer of short stories and novels
 Joshua Ferris (M.F.A.) – author of Then We Came to the End which was nominated for the National Book Award and won the PEN/Hemingway Award
 Brian Flemming (B.A. 1998, English) – director and playwright
 Richard Ford (M.F.A. 1970) – Pulitzer Prize-winning author in Fiction for Independence Day
 Glen David Gold (M.F.A . 1998) – author of Carter Beats the Devil and Sunnyside
 Yusef Komunyakaa (M.F.A. 1980) – Pulitzer Prize-winning poet for Neon Vernacular
 T. Jefferson Parker (M.F.A. 1976) – fiction writer and author of Laguna Heat, Little Saigon, and Pacific Heat
 Alice Sebold (M.F.A. 1998) – bestselling novelist, author of The Lovely Bones
 Danzy Senna (M.F.A. 1996) – writer
 Maria Helena Viramontes (M.F.A. 1994) – Chicana fiction writer
 Peter Wild (M.F.A. 1969) – poet, historian, and Professor of English at the University of Arizona

Music
 Joey Burns – frontman of Calexico
 Clara Chung (B.A. 2009, Psychology) – guitarist and singer
 Gregory Coleman (M.A. 2005, Fine Arts) – classical guitarist, recording artist, composer, arranger, educator
 Coco Lee (attended) – Chinese pop star
 Till Kahrs (B.A. 1979, Social Science) - recording artist, singer-songwriter, communication skills expert
 Kevin Kwan Loucks (B.M. 2004, Piano Performance) – International Concert Pianist; President and Co-Founder of Chamber Music OC; Member of Classical Music Ensemble Trio Céleste 
 Jeffrey Mumford (B.A. 1977) – classical music composer
 Aubrey O'Day (B.A. 2005, Political Science) – member of Danity Kane (Making the Band 3 contestant)
 Savitree Suttichanond (B.A. 2007, International Studies) – Thai singer and actress, Academy Fantasia Season 5
 Kaba Modern – Asian-American dance group established in 1992; 6 alumni dancers appeared on America's Best Dance Crew
 Teal Wicks (B.A. 2005, Drama) – American singer and stage actress, best known for playing the role of Elphaba in the Broadway production of the musical Wicked
 Vanness Wu – Taiwanese singer, actor, director, producer, member of F4 (band)
Members of Farside – hardcore punk band
Members of Thrice – hardcore/rock Band
 Kei Akagi – toured as pianist for famous jazz musician and composer Miles Davis
 Joseph Vincent – YouTube singer/songwriter
Members of Milo Greene – indie/pop band
Members of SLANDER – trap DJ duo

Baseball
 Brady Anderson (attended, Economics) – former Major League Baseball (MLB) outfielder for the Boston Red Sox and the Baltimore Orioles, three-time American League all-star
 Dylan Axelrod (B.A. 2007, Social Ecology) – former MLB pitcher for the Chicago White Sox and Cincinnati Reds
 Christian Bergman – former MLB pitcher for the Colorado Rockies and Seattle Mariners
 Keston Hiura – MLB infielder for the Milwaukee Brewers
 Doug Linton – former MLB, Korea Baseball Organization (KBO), and Chinese Professional Baseball League (CPBL) pitcher
Ben Orloff, former minor league baseball player and current UCI head coach
 Bryan Petersen – former MLB outfielder for the Florida Marlins
 Sean Tracey – former MLB pitcher for the Baltimore Orioles and Chicago White Sox
 Gary Wheelock – former MLB pitcher for the California Angels and Seattle Mariners

Basketball
 Scott Brooks (B.A. 1987) – former head coach of the NBA team Oklahoma City Thunder; point guard on the 1994 NBA Champion Houston Rockets, current head coach of the Washington Wizards
 Steve Cleveland (B.A. 1976) – men's head basketball coach at Fresno State University
 Kevin Magee (1959–2003) - basketball player
 Tod Murphy (B.A. 1986) – former NBA player and third-round pick of the Seattle SuperSonics in the 1986 NBA draft; assistant coach for the UCI Men's basketball team
 Tom Tolbert (transferred) – former NBA player and current color-commentator for ABC sports

Olympians
 Peter Campbell (B.A. 1982) – won two silver medals (1984 and 1988) Olympics (water polo)
 Jennifer Chandler – gold medalist in the 1976 Olympics (diving)
 Gary Figueroa (B.A. 1980) – silver medalist in the 1984 Olympics (water polo)
 Brad Alan Lewis (B.A. 1976) – gold medalist in the 1984 Olympics (rowing), author of Assault on Lake Casitas
 Greg Louganis (B.A. 1983) – four-time Olympic gold medalist (diving)
 Amber Neben (M.S. Biology) – U.S. National Road Race Champion, 2005 & 2006 Tour de l'Aude winner, 2008 World TT Champion, and placed 33rd in the road race at the 2008 Olympics
 Mike Powell – world long jump record-holder; two-time Olympic silver medalist (track and field)
 Steve Scott (B.A. 1978) – American record holder for the indoor mile (3:58.7); world record holder for the most sub-Four-minute miles (136)

Soccer
 Carlos Aguilar – forward for the Rochester Rhinos of USL Professional Division
 Cameron Dunn – defender for the Los Angeles Blues of the USL Professional Division
 Brad Evans – midfielder for the Seattle Sounders of Major League Soccer and the United States men's national soccer team
 Irving Garcia – forward for the New York Red Bulls of Major League Soccer
 Anthony Hamilton (B.A. 2010, Literary Journalism) – forward for the Rochester Rhinos of the USL Professional Division
 Miguel Ibarra - midfielder for Minnesota United of Major League Soccer
 Cameron Iwasa - forward for Sporting Kansas City of Major League Soccer
 Kenny Schoeni (B.A. 2006) – former goalkeeper for the Columbus Crew of Major League Soccer
 David Sias (B.A. 2008, Economics) – former defender for the Austin Aztex of the USL Professional Division
 Cami Privett (Majored in Sociology) - Former NWSL Soccer Player for the Houston Dash

Other athletics
 David Baker (B.A. 1975) – commissioner of the Arena Football League, 1996 to present
 Carl Cheffers – National Football League official. Head referee for Super Bowl LI and Super Bowl LV.
 Shane del Rosario (B.A. Psychology) – professional mixed martial artist
 Darren Fells (B.A. Sociology) – tight end for the Houston Texans. Played basketball at UCI and professionally in Europe and Latin America. 
 Jillian Kraus (born 1986; MBA), water polo player
 Joe Lacob (B.S. Biological Sciences) – owner of NBA's Golden State Warriors
 Richard Lubner (born 1967), South African-born tennis player

Business
 Arnnon Geshuri – corporate human relations executive
 Wright Massey (M.B.A. 1992) – CEO of Brand Architecture, Inc.
 Betsy McLaughlin (B.A.) – CEO of Hot Topic, Inc.
 Vince Steckler (B.A.) – CEO of Avast Software

Military
 John P. Condon (Ph.D. 1976) - U.S. Marine Corps Major General and Aviator
 Leon J. LaPorte (M.B.A. 1977) – retired United States Army General who served as Commander, United States Forces Korea until 2006
 Laura Yeager, U.S. Army general, first woman to command an Army infantry division

Miscellaneous
 Generosa Ammon (B.A. 1981) – widow of Ted Ammon
 Khaldoun Baghdadi (B.A.) – Palestinian-American attorney
 David J.R. Frakt (B.A. 1990, History) – lawyer, law professor, noted for his appointment to defend Guantanamo detainee Mohammed Jawad
 Erin Gruwell (B.A. 1991) – high school teacher whose real-life story inspired the movie Freedom Writers
 Michael Ramirez (B.S. 1984) – 1994 Pulitzer Prize for Editorial Cartooning in the Memphis Commercial Appeal; senior editor for Investor's Business Daily
 Lisa Marie Scott (attended) – Playboy centerfold, February 1995

Politics and government
 Ami Bera (B.S. 1987, Biological Sciences & M.D. 1991) – United States Congressman representing California's 7th Congressional District
 Tim Donnelly (B.A. 1989) – California State Assemblyman representing the 59th assembly district
 Jeremy Harris (M.S. Environmental Biology) – former mayor of Honolulu
 Mark Keam (B.A. 1988, Political Science) – member of the Virginia House of Delegates representing the 35th district
 Bill Leonard (B.A. 1969, History) – former California State Senator
 Linda Newell (B.A.) – Colorado State Senator representing the 26th District
 Janet Nguyen (B.A. 1998, Political Science) – member of the Orange County Board of Supervisors, first Vietnamese-American to hold county office in the United States
 Geoffrey R. Pyatt (B.A. 1985) - U.S. Ambassador to Greece
 Michael A. Rice (PhD 1987, Comparative Psychology) – Rhode Island State Representative representing the 35th District
 Jose Solorio (B.S. 1992, Social Ecology) – California State Assemblyman, prior Councilmember of Ward 1 – City of Santa Ana
 Audra Strickland (B.A. 1996, Political Science) – California State Assemblywoman representing the 37th assembly district
 Van Tran (B.A. 1990, Political Science) – California State Assemblyman, first Vietnamese-American state legislator in the United States

Science and technology
 Paul Chien (PhD 1971) – biologist known for research on the physiology and ecology of intertidal organisms
 Deanna M. Church (PhD 1997) – bioinformatics and genomics researcher
 Charles Falco (PhD 1974) – experimental physicist whose research resulted in the Hockney-Falco Thesis
 Roy Fielding (PhD 2000) – Internet pioneer, creator of HTTP 1.1, co-founder of Apache Foundation
 Efi Foufoula-Georgiou Prof Env. Engineer on staff 
 Bart Kosko (PhD 1987) – hybrid intelligent system expert
 Lawrence L. Larmore (PhD 1986) – online algorithms researcher, faculty member at UC Riverside and UNLV
 James D. McCaffrey (B.A. 1975) – software engineer and author; see combinatorial number system and factorial number system
 Paul Mockapetris (PhD 1982, Computer Science) – Internet pioneer, co-inventor of the Domain Name System
 Kathie L. Olsen (PhD 1979, Neuroscience) – chief operating officer of the National Science Foundation
 Andrew P. Ordon (B.S. 1972) – plastic surgeon, host of The Doctors
 Cecilia Richards (PhD 1990) - mechanical engineer, first woman to earn a doctorate in mechanical engineering at the university
 Jim Whitehead, (PhD 2000) – originator of WebDAV, UCSC professor

Social Scientists
 Noeline Alcorn - education researcher
 Sara Diamond (B.A. 1980) – sociologist
 Kevin Nadal (BA, 2000) - Professor of Psychology, Author, Media correspondent.

Faculty

Vartkess Ara Apkarian – Distinguished Professor of Chemistry and Director of Center for Chemistry at the Space-Time Limit 
Francisco J. Ayala – 2001 National Medal of Science, 2010 Templeton Prize, Founding Director of the Bren Fellows Program, Professor of Ecology and Evolutionary Biology, and of Philosophy
 Ricardo Asch – fertility doctor and fugitive, accused of stealing ova from women while a UC Irvine employee
 Pierre Baldi – Chancellor's Professor of Computer Science and director of the Institute for Genomics and Bioinformatics
 Lindon W. Barrett – Director of African Studies, professor and cultural theorist
 Gregory Benford – physicist, science fiction author of the Galactic Center Saga
 George W. Brown – Information scientist and dean of the business school
 Jan Brueckner - Distinguished Professor of Economics
 Ron Carlson – Professor of English, MFA Programs in Writing
 Leo Chavez – anthropologist and author
 Erwin Chemerinsky – founding dean of the UCI School of Law, lawyer, law professor, and United States constitutional law and civil procedure scholar
 Robert Cohen – acting teacher and author
 Rui de Figueiredo – Research Professor of Electrical Engineering and Computer Science, and Mathematics
 Jacques Derrida (1986 – 2004 [his death]) – philosopher
 Paul Dourish – Professor of Informatics
 Nikil Dutt – Chancellor's Professor of Computer Science
 David Eppstein – Professor of Computer Science
 Walter M. Fitch – Professor of Molecular Evolution
 Victor Fleischer – Professor of Law 
 Michael Franz – Chancellor's Professor of Computer Science
 Matthew Foreman – Professor of Mathematics
 Robert Garfias – musicologist, awarded the Order of the Rising Sun
 Jean-Luc Gaudiot — professor at the Henry Samuel School of Engineering
 Amy Gerstler – poet, Professor of English, winner of National Book Critics Circle Award
 Michael T. Goodrich – Chancellor's Professor of Computer Science
 Louis A. Gottschalk –  neuroscientist, Professor Emeritus
Jutta Heckhausen – Professor of Psychological Science
 Payam Heydari – Chancellor's Professor of Electrical Engineering and Computer Science
 James D. Herbert – professor and chair of the Art History department
 Dan Hirschberg – Professor of Computer Science
 Hamid Jafarkhani – Professor of Electrical Engineering and Computer Science
 Ramesh Jain – Bren Professor of Computer Science
 Valerie Jenness – Professor of Criminology, Law & Society, Sociology, and Nursing Science
Wilson Ho – Donald Bren Professor of Physics and Chemistry and discoverer of scanning tunneling microscopy based inelastic electron tunneling spectroscopy 
 Murray Krieger – literary critic and theorist
 Michelle Latiolais – Professor of English, MFA Programs in Writing
 Elizabeth Loftus – psychologist, Distinguished Professor in the School of Social Ecology
 R. Duncan Luce – cognitive psychologist, 2003 National Medal of Science, Distinguished Research Professor of Cognitive Science
 George Marcus – Chancellor's Professor of Anthropology
Athina Markopoulou – Chancellor's Professor of Engineering
 James McGaugh – Research Professor of Neurobiology and Behavior, founding Director of the Center for the Neurobiology of Learning and Memory
 Donald McKayle – choreographer
 Penelope Maddy – Distinguished Professor of Logic and Philosophy of Science and Mathematics, famous for her work in philosophy of mathematics
 David B. Malament – Distinguished Professor of Logic and Philosophy of Science, best known for his work in the philosophy of physics.
 J. Hillis Miller – literary critic
Peter Navarro-Professor of business, incumbent director of the White House National Trade Council
 Bonnie Nardi – Professor of Informatics
 David Neumark – Professor of Economics, expert on labor economics
 Ngũgĩ wa Thiong'o – author of A Grain of Wheat, Distinguished Professor in the School of Humanities and director of the International Center for Writing and Translation
 James Nowick – Professor of Chemistry 
 William H. Parker, Professor of Physics
 Richard E. Pattis – author of the Karel programming language
 Lyman W. Porter - dean of UC Irvine's Paul Merage School of Business from 1972 to 1983
 Curt Pringle – mayor of Anaheim, former speaker of the California State Assembly
 R. Radhakrishnan – Chancellor's Professor of English and Comparative Literature
 Nasrin Rahimieh – Howard Baskerville Professor of Humanities in the Department of Comparative Literature and the Director of the Humanities Core program.
 Frederick Reines (deceased) – Nobel laureate, Physics 1995; faculty from 1966 to 1998.
 Irwin Rose – Nobel laureate (Chemistry 2004)
 Eric Rignot – Professor of Earth System Science
 F. Sherwood Rowland – Nobel laureate (Chemistry 1995), Research Professor in Chemistry and Earth System Science
 Donald G. Saari – Distinguished Professor of Mathematics and Economics
 Dr. William Sears  – Associate Clinical Professor of Pediatrics, author of the Sears Parenting Library
 Patricia Seed – Professor of History
 Barry Siegel – Pulitzer Prize winner
 Brian Skyrms – philosophy of science expert, Distinguished Professor of social science
 David A. Snow – Distinguished Professor of Sociology
 Etel L. Solingen – Tierney Chair, Professor of Political Science, former President of the International Studies Association, 2012–2013, author of award-winning Nuclear Logics
 George Sperling – cognitive psychologist, Distinguished Professor of Cognitive Science
 Grover C. Stephens (faculty 1964–2003, deceased) – Professor and dean of Biological Sciences
 Lee Swindlehurst – Professor of Electrical Engineering and Computer Science
 Rein Taagepera (until 1991) – Estonian politician and political scientist
 Timothy M. P. Tait - Chancellor's Professor of Physics and Astronomy
 Edward O. Thorp – author (Beat the Dealer: A Winning Strategy for the Game of Twenty-One), professor of mathematics
 Deborah Vandell, Founding Dean of the School of Education, expert on child care and after-school programs
 Frederic Wan - professor emeritus of Applied Mathematics
 Martin Wattenberg – political scientist
 Douglas R. White – social anthropologist and network sociologist, author of Network Analysis and Ethnographic Problems
Kumar  Wickramasinghe – Henry Samueli Endowed Chair and inventor of  Kelvin Probe Force Microscopy and other microscopy techniques 
 Jon Wiener - historian
 Geoffrey Wolff – co-director of a writing program
Jenny Y Yang – chemist

Staff and administrators 
 Daniel Aldrich - founding chancellor
 Ralph J. Cicerone – fourth chancellor, former president of the National Academy of Sciences
 Larry Coon – basketball writer
 Michael V. Drake - fifth chancellor, president of Ohio State University
 Jack Peltason - second chancellor, former president of the University of California
 William Pereira -- original architect of the campus and surrounding city
 Tom Jennings – creator of FidoNet

References 

Irvine people